Galloisiana odaesanensis is a species of insect in the family Grylloblattidae. Its type locality is Mount Odae in Gangwon Province, South Korea.

Specimens have also been collected at Sangwonsa.

References

Grylloblattidae
Insects of Korea